Events in the year 2018 in Libya.

Incumbents
 President: Aguila Saleh Issa
 Prime Minister: Abdullah al-Thani

Events

Libyan Civil War (2014–present)
27 August to 25 September – Battle of Tripoli
19 December – Battle of Saddada Castle
27 December – Battle of Traghan

Deaths

9 May – Omar Daoud, footballer (b. 1983).

20 May – Ali Hassanein, politician (b. 1925)

References

 
2010s in Libya 
Years of the 21st century in Libya 
Libya 
Libya